Marion Michel (born 9 July 1964) is a Belgian former swimmer. She competed in the women's 100 metre butterfly and women's 200 metre butterfly events at the 1980 Summer Olympics.

References

External links
 

1964 births
Living people
Belgian female butterfly swimmers
Olympic swimmers of Belgium
Swimmers at the 1980 Summer Olympics
People from Eupen
Sportspeople from Liège Province
20th-century Belgian women